Elias Hanna Al Rahbani (26 June 1938 – 4 January 2021) was a Lebanese musician, composer, songwriter, orchestra conductor, and reality television personality, sitting as judge on a number of talent shows. He composed more than 2,500 songs, including 2,000 in Arabic. He wrote the soundtrack for more than 25 films, a number of TV series, and also composed musical scores for the piano. He composed songs for a number of artists, including Fairuz and Sabah.

Beginnings

Rahbani was born into a musical family. His older siblings were Assi and Mansour, known as the Rahbani brothers. He studied music at the Lebanese Academy (1945–1958) and did his specialization at the National Music College from 1955 to 1956. His older brothers also arranged private lessons for him for almost ten years, under the supervision of French music professors.

In 1957, at the age of nineteen, Rahbani wanted to continue his musical studies in Moscow but injured his right hand, which meant the end of his dreams of becoming a major piano player. He later trained with his left hand and concentrated on music composition instead.

Career

In 1958, Rahbani had his break, at the age of twenty, when the Arabic Service of the BBC contacted him about composing forty songs and writing the soundtracks to thirteen BBC Arabic radio productions. In 1962, he wrote "Ma Ahlaha" (ما أحلاها) for Lebanese singer Nasri Shamseddine and became a program director and musical consultant for Radio Lebanon, where he also met his future wife, Nina Khalil. The couple married and stayed together for the rest of their lives. Rahbani stayed at Radio Lebanon until 1972 but also continued his career as a record producer with a number of record companies in Lebanon. At the beginning of the Lebanese Civil War in 1976, he moved to Paris.

Rahbani has to his record hundreds of successful Lebanese and pan-Arab music, some in foreign musical adaptations, but mostly in Arabic music. Of his foreign songs, some notable titles include "La Guerre est finie", sung by Lebanese Armenian singer Manuel Menengichian and "Mory", a sea song sung by Lebanese singer Sammy Clark.

Rahbani accused Saber Rebaï of plagiarizing his music with the song "Atahadda al 'aalam" (أتحدى العالم). When the songwriter Khaled Bakri and his record company, Rotana Records, denied the charges, Rahbani filed a lawsuit, in which a committee of musicians noted similarities between the Saber Rebai song and Rahbani's musical score "Nina Maria", and ordered Rotana Records to withdraw the album and add credits to Rahbani.

Rahbani has written numerous songs for Fairuz and Sabah. Other Rahbani compositions have been sung by Wadih Safi, Melhem Barakat, Nasri Shamseddine, Majida El Roumi, and contemporary singers including Julia Boutros, Pascale Sakr, and Haifa Wehbe.

In 1996, Rahbani published the poetry collection Nafizat el Omr (A window to my life). In 2001, he composed a song for the Organisation internationale de la Francophonie summit held in Beirut, Lebanon.

Awards

From many of his awards, the Athenes Festival Award for "La guerre est finie", The Youth Award for Classical Music in 1964, an award for a musical score in 1970, Cinema award for International Advertisement Film Award in Venice in 1977, 2nd Award for the London International Advertising Festival in 1995, various awards from Brazil, Greece and Bulgaria, Award for Best Song for "Mory" at the Rostock Festival in Germany. He was also awarded an honorary doctorate from the Barrington University in Washington, and the American University in Asturias, Spain.

Television
Rahbani has taken part in a number of televised talent shows in Lebanon and the Arab world, including being a judge on the singing competition SuperStar. He also took part in the launch of Rotana Academy for Teaching of Music in 2004, but left soon afterwards. He was honorary judge for seasons 10 and 11 of Star Academy.

Personal life
Elias Rahbani was married to Nina Maria Khalil. They had three children together, including Ghassan. He died on 4 January 2021, at the Rafik Hariri University Hospital, from complications due to COVID-19 during the coronavirus pandemic in Lebanon.

Discography

Studio albums

Collaboration albums

Soundtracks

Songs for Fairuz

Songs for Sabah

Songs for Georgette Sayegh

Other notable songs

Sources
 Rahbani Brothers: Elias Rahbani biography

References

External links
 
 

1938 births
2021 deaths
Lebanese songwriters
Lebanese musicians
Lebanese composers
People from Matn District
Eastern Orthodox Christians from Lebanon
Deaths from the COVID-19 pandemic in Lebanon